Team TG FF, also known as Team ThorenGruppen, is a Swedish football club located in Umeå. The club was founded in 2014. In 2015 the club took over Tegs SK FF, a secession of the senior team in Tegs SK.

Background
Team ThorenGruppen SK was founded in 2005 as a floorball club. Until 2014 the club was mainly associated with floorball. The football club is affiliated to the Västerbottens Fotbollförbund.

Season to season

Current squad

Footnotes

External links
 Team Thorengruppen SK – Official website

Sport in Umeå
Football clubs in Västerbotten County
Orienteering clubs in Sweden
Association football clubs established in 1898
1898 establishments in Sweden